The Independent Spirit Award for Best Screenplay is one of the annual awards given out by Film Independent, a non-profit organization dedicated to independent film and independent filmmakers. It was first presented in 1985 with Horton Foote being the first winner of the awards for The Trip to Bountiful, Foote also received a nomination for the Academy Award for Best Adapted Screenplay for the film.

The category includes both original and adapted screenplays. Despite the creation of the Best First Screenplay category in 1994, first screenplays are also elegible to compete for this award.

Alexander Payne is the most awarded writer in the category with three wins, followed by Neal Jimenez, Gus Van Sant and Jim Taylor with two wins each. Sofia Coppola was the first female writer to win the award.

Winners and nominees

1980s

1990s

2000s

2010s

2020s

See also
 Golden Globe Award for Best Screenplay
 BAFTA Award for Best Original Screenplay
 BAFTA Award for Best Adapted Screenplay
 Academy Award for Best Original Screenplay
 Academy Award for Best Adapted Screenplay
 Critics' Choice Movie Award for Best Original Screenplay
 Critics' Choice Movie Award for Best Adapted Screenplay
 Writers Guild of America Award for Best Original Screenplay
 Writers Guild of America Award for Best Adapted Screenplay

References

S
Screenwriting awards for film
Awards established in 1985